In enzymology, a nickel-transporting ATPase is an enzyme that catalyzes the chemical reaction

ATP + H2O + Ni2+out  ADP + phosphate + Ni2+in

The 3 substrates of this enzyme are ATP, H2O, and Ni2+, whereas its 3 products are ADP, phosphate, and Ni2+.

This enzyme belongs to the family of hydrolases, specifically those acting on acid anhydrides to catalyse transmembrane movement of substances. The systematic name of this enzyme class is ATP phosphohydrolase (nickel-importing).

Structural studies 

References 

 
 
 
 

EC 3.6.3
Enzymes of known structure